WLLL (930 kHz) is a commercial AM radio station licensed to Lynchburg, Virginia.  It broadcasts an urban gospel radio format and is owned and operated by Hubbard's Advertising Agency, Inc.  The radio studios and offices are on Whitehall Road in Lynchburg.

By day, WLLL is powered at 9,000 watts non-directional.  But to protect other stations on 930 AM from interference, WLLL reduces power at night to only 42 watts.  The transmitter is on Chapel Lane in Lynchburg, near the Lynchburg Expressway (U.S. Route 501).

History
The station was owned by the Griffith Broadcasting Corporation. It was originally a daytimer, required to go off the air at night.  

In the 1960s and 70s, WLLL was a Top 40 station, playing the hits of the day.  It was an affiliate of the NBC Radio Network.  In 1970, it added an FM counterpart, WLLL-FM, which at first simulcast AM 930.  It later aired an automated oldies format as WGOL and today is WZZU.

References

External links
 AM930 WLLL Online

Radio stations established in 1963
1963 establishments in Virginia
Gospel radio stations in the United States
LLL